In differential geometry, the tangent bundle of a differentiable manifold  is a manifold  which assembles all the tangent vectors in . That is,

There is a natural projection

This projection maps each element of the tangent space  to the single point .

The tangent bundle comes equipped with a natural topology (described in a section below). With this topology, the tangent bundle to a manifold is the prototypical example of a vector bundle (which is a fiber bundle whose fibers are vector spaces). By definition, a manifold  is parallelizable if and only if the tangent bundle is trivial. By definition, a manifold  is framed if and only if the tangent bundle  is stably trivial, meaning that for some trivial bundle  the Whitney sum  is trivial.

Role
One of the main roles of the tangent bundle is to provide a domain and range for the derivative of a smooth function.

Topology and smooth structure
The tangent bundle comes equipped with a natural topology (not the disjoint union topology) and smooth structure so as to make it into a manifold in its own right.

Each tangent space of an n-dimensional manifold is an n-dimensional vector space. As a manifold, however,  is not always diffeomorphic to the product manifold . When it is of the form , then the tangent bundle is said to be trivial. Trivial tangent bundles usually occur for manifolds equipped with a 'compatible group structure'; for instance, in the case where the manifold is a Lie group. The tangent bundle of the unit circle is trivial because it is a Lie group (under multiplication and its natural differential structure). It is not true however that all spaces with trivial tangent bundles are Lie groups; manifolds which have a trivial tangent bundle are called parallelizable.

is a diffeomorphism. These local coordinates on  give rise to an isomorphism  for all . We may then define a map

by

The tangent bundle is an example of a more general construction called a vector bundle (which is itself a specific kind of fiber bundle). Explicitly, the tangent bundle to an -dimensional manifold  may be defined as a rank  vector bundle over  whose transition functions are given by the Jacobian of the associated coordinate transformations.

Examples
In this case the tangent bundle is trivial: each  is canonically isomorphic to  via the map  which subtracts , giving a diffeomorphism .

Another simple example is the unit circle,  (see picture above). Geometrically, this is a cylinder of infinite height.

The only tangent bundles that can be readily visualized are those of the real line  and the unit circle , both of which are trivial. For 2-dimensional manifolds the tangent bundle is 4-dimensional and hence difficult to visualize.

A simple example of a nontrivial tangent bundle is that of the unit sphere : this tangent bundle is nontrivial as a consequence of the hairy ball theorem. Therefore, the sphere is not parallelizable.

Vector fields
A smooth assignment of a tangent vector to each point of a manifold is called a vector field. Specifically, a vector field on a manifold  is a smooth map

In the language of fiber bundles, such a map is called a section.

Vector fields can be added together pointwise

and multiplied by smooth functions on M

to get other vector fields. The set of all vector fields  then takes on the structure of a module over the commutative algebra of smooth functions on M, denoted .

That is, a local vector field is defined only on some open set  and assigns to each point of  a vector in the associated tangent space.

Equivalently, a differential 1-form  maps a smooth vector field  to a smooth function .

Higher-order tangent bundles
Since the tangent bundle  is itself a smooth manifold, the second-order tangent bundle can be defined via repeated application of the tangent bundle construction:

A smooth map  has an induced derivative, for which the tangent bundle is the appropriate domain and range .  Similarly, higher-order tangent bundles provide the domain and range for higher-order derivatives .

A distinct but related construction are the jet bundles on a manifold, which are bundles consisting of jets.

Canonical vector field on tangent bundle
On every tangent bundle , considered as a manifold itself, one can define a canonical vector field  as the diagonal map on the tangent space at each point. This is possible because the tangent space of a vector space W is naturally a product,  since the vector space itself is flat, and thus has a natural diagonal map  given by  under this product structure. Applying this product structure to the tangent space at each point and globalizing yields the canonical vector field.

and the map  is the projection onto the first coordinates:

Splitting the first map via the zero section and the second map by the diagonal yields the canonical vector field.

More concisely,  – the first pair of coordinates do not change because it is the section of a bundle and these are just the point in the base space: the last pair of coordinates are the section itself.

Alternatively, consider the scalar multiplication function:

The derivative of this function with respect to the variable  at time  is a function , which is an alternative description of the canonical vector field.

Sometimes  is also called the Liouville vector field, or radial vector field. Using  one can characterize the tangent bundle. Essentially,  can be characterized using 4 axioms, and if a manifold has a vector field satisfying these axioms, then the manifold is a tangent bundle and the vector field is the canonical vector field on it. See for example, De León et al.

Lifts

See also
 Pushforward (differential)
 Unit tangent bundle
 Cotangent bundle
 Frame bundle
 Musical isomorphism

Notes

References

 . 
 John M. Lee, Introduction to Smooth Manifolds, (2003) Springer-Verlag, New York. .
 Jürgen Jost, Riemannian Geometry and Geometric Analysis, (2002) Springer-Verlag, Berlin. 
 Ralph Abraham and Jerrold E. Marsden, Foundations of Mechanics, (1978) Benjamin-Cummings, London. 
 M. De León, E. Merino, J.A. Oubiña, M. Salgado, A characterization of tangent and stable tangent bundles, Annales de l'institut Henri Poincaré (A) Physique théorique, Vol. 61, no. 1, 1994, 1-15

External links
 
 Wolfram MathWorld: Tangent Bundle
 PlanetMath: Tangent Bundle

Differential topology
Vector bundles